Subedar Subramanian,  (18 December 1912 – 24 February 1944) was the first Indian to be awarded the George Cross.

Subramanian served with Queen Victoria's Own Madras Sappers and Miners, a unit of the Indian Army, during the Second World War. On 24 February 1944, during the Allied campaign in Italy he won the George Cross at Mignano by throwing himself onto a mine about to detonate and thus successfully protecting others from the blast.  His award was gazetted posthumously on 30 June 1944. He was also awarded the Indian Distinguished Service Medal.

Footnotes

References
Kempton, Chris, The Victoria Crosses and George Crosses of the Honourable East India Company and Indian Army, Military Press, 2001, 
Turner, John Frayn, Awards of the George Cross, 1940–2009, Casemate Publishers, 2010.

1912 births
1944 deaths
British Indian Army soldiers
Indian Army personnel killed in World War II
Indian recipients of the George Cross
Recipients of the Indian Distinguished Service Medal
Landmine victims
Military personnel from Chennai